Cystiscus vitiensis is a species of very small sea snail, a marine gastropod mollusk or micromollusk in the family Cystiscidae.

Description
The size of the shell attains 1.76 mm.

Distribution
This marine species occurs off the Fiji Islands
.

References

Cystiscidae
Gastropods described in 2006
Vitiensis